The Hero of the People's Armed Forces are designations of the Socialist Republic of Vietnam.

Qualifications for receiving
The Hero of the People's Armed Force is awarded to individuals with "exceptionally outstanding achievements in combat, combat service and work, represent the revolutionary heroism in the cause of national liberation, national defense and the protection the people".

The award also goes to collectives that meet this standard and are loyal to the socialist Fatherland of Vietnam, have maintained good internal unity, with clean and strong Party and mass organizations.

Precursor
The precursor of this title was the Hero of the Military and Hero of the Liberate the South Force honors.

See also
 Vietnam awards and decorations

References

 
Military awards and decorations of Vietnam
Orders, decorations, and medals of Vietnam
Hero (title)